Othello is an unincorporated community and census-designated place located within Greenwich Township, Cumberland County, New Jersey, United States. It was first listed as a CDP in the 2020 census with a population of 132.

It is part of the Greenwich Historic District, which has been on the National Register of Historic Places since 1972.

Geography
Othello is located in the part of Greenwich Township referred to locally as the Head of Greenwich, or Upper Greenwich.

County routes passing through Othello include Ye Greate Street (CR 623 and CR 703) and Sheppards Mill Road (CR 650).

Pine Mount Creek is a stream that flows south through Othello to the Cohansey River and empties into Delaware Bay.

Demographics

History
There were three taverns in old Greenwich: One was the Old Stone Tavern, on Ye Greate Street, another on the wharf, and the third situated in the Ewing-Bacon House, a.k.a. Resurrection Hall, at the head of Greenwich, a.k.a. Othello. Charles Ewing named the family homestead Resurrection Hall. The oldest part of the house was built by Thomas Ewing in the early 18th century. Thomas Ewing, Jr (1722-1771) was a blacksmith and Presbyterian elder.

Othello and nearby Springtown were stations on the Underground Railroad.

While Othello only had a post office from 12 April 1897 until 15 November 1906, the community continues to appear on many maps.

References

External links
Othello, Greenwich, New Jersey (Google Maps)

Greenwich Township, Cumberland County, New Jersey
Unincorporated communities in Cumberland County, New Jersey
Unincorporated communities in New Jersey
Census-designated places in Cumberland County, New Jersey
Census-designated places in New Jersey